The 2007–08 Utah Jazz season was their 34th season in the NBA and 28th in Salt Lake City. The Jazz had the best team offensive rating in the NBA.

The Jazz continued to play consistent all season, finishing with a 54-28 record. They defeated the Houston Rockets in the opening round, but were ousted by the Los Angeles Lakers in the next round.

Key dates prior to the start of the season:
 The 2007 NBA draft took place in New York City on June 28.
 The free agency period begins in July.

Offseason

Draft picks
Utah's selections from the 2007 NBA draft in New York City.

Roster

Regular season

Standings

Record vs. opponents

Game log

October
Record: 1–0; Home: 0–0; Road: 1–0

November
Record: 11–5; Home: 7–1; Road: 4–4

December
Record: 5–11; Home: 4–2; Road: 1–9

January 
Record: 11–2; Home: 9–0; Road: 2–2

February 
Record: 9–4; Home: 5–0; Road: 4–4

March 
Record: 12–4; Home: 8–1; Road: 4–3

April 
Record: 5–2; Home: 4–0; Road: 1–2

 Green background indicates win.
 Red background indicates loss.

Player stats

Regular season 

*Total for entire season including previous team(s)

Playoffs

Playoffs

|- bgcolor="bbffbb"
| 1 || April 19 || @ Houston || 93–82 || Kirilenko (21) || Boozer (16) || Williams (10) ||Toyota Center18,213 || 1–0
|- bgcolor="bbffbb"
| 2 || April 21 || @ Houston || 90–84 || Williams (22) || Okur (16) || Williams (5) ||Toyota Center18,158 || 2–0
|- bgcolor="edbebf"
| 3 || April 24 || Houston || 92–94 || Williams (28) || Boozer (13) || Williams (12) ||EnergySolutions Arena19,911 || 2–1
|- bgcolor="bbffbb"
| 4 || April 26 || Houston || 86–82 || Williams (17) || Okur (18) || Williams (9) ||EnergySolutions Arena19,911 || 3–1
|- bgcolor="edbebf"
| 5 || April 29 || @ Houston || 69–95 || Boozer (19) || Boozer, Okur (10) || Williams (6) ||Toyota Center18,269 || 3–2
|- bgcolor="bbffbb"
| 6 || May 2 || Houston || 113–91 || Williams (25) || Okur (13) || Williams (9) ||EnergySolutions Arena19,911 || 4–2
|-

|- bgcolor="edbebf"
| 1 || May 4 || @ L.A. Lakers || 98–109 || Okur (21) || Okur (19) || Williams (9) ||Staples Center18,997 || 0–1
|- bgcolor="edbebf"
| 2 || May 7 || @ L.A. Lakers || 110–120 || Williams (25) || Millsap (10) || Williams (10) ||Staples Center18,997 || 0–2
|- bgcolor="#bbffbb"
| 3 || May 9 || L.A. Lakers  || 104–99 || Boozer (27) || Boozer (20) || Williams (12) ||EnergySolutions Arena19,911 || 1–2
|- bgcolor="#bbffbb"
| 4 || May 11 || L.A. Lakers || 123–115 || Williams (29) || Boozer (12) || Williams (14) ||EnergySolutions Arena19,911 || 2–2
|- bgcolor="edbebf"
| 5 || May 14 || @ L.A. Lakers || 104–111 || Williams (27) || Okur (13) || Williams (10) ||Staples Center18,997 || 2–3
|- bgcolor="edbebf"
| 6 || May 16 || L.A. Lakers || 105–108 || Williams (21) || Boozer (14) || Williams (14) || EnergySolutions Arena19,911 || 2–4
|-

Awards and records
During the season, Andrei Kirilenko was named FIBA Europe Player of the Year as the top European player in 2007. Unlike NBA awards, which are presented at the end of the season, Europe's major continent-wide player awards are presented at the end of a calendar year, and consider players' performances for both their clubs and national teams.

Records

Milestones

Transactions
The Jazz have been involved in the following transactions during the 2007–08 season.

Trades
On December 29, 2007 the Utah Jazz announced that they would trade Gordan Giricek and a first round draft pick (through 2009–2014 pick) to the Philadelphia 76ers for Kyle Korver.

Before this trade the Jazz team lacked an outside shooter that they could count on during clutch times. Located in the western conference, Utah Jazz knew they had to make a blockbuster trade since top teams like Dallas Mavericks and Phoenix Suns were making their own big time trades.

After the trade Jazz had an up tempo team which led them to long winning streaks along with moving up the western conference standings.  As a result, the Jazz had virtually clinched a spot in for the playoffs, the question now was which spot they would clinch.

Free agents

See also
 2007–08 NBA season
 2008 NBA Playoffs

References

Utah Jazz seasons
Utah
Utah
Utah